Boolardy Station  is a remote former sheep and cattle station in the Mid West (Murchison) region of Western Australia, about  north-north-east of Pindar and  west-south-west of Meekatharra. It is within the Shire of Murchison and situated on pastoral lease no. 3114/406 (Crown lease 146/1966).

Description
An area of  within the station was composed of  reserves and crown land. In 2011 a report stated that the soil had a low level of erosion, with 87% of the land being described as nil or minor. The perennial vegetation condition was fair, with 39% of vegetation cover being described as poor or very poor.

The property was an important pastoral property in the Murchison region, with the Boolardy Homestead used as offices of the Murchison Road Board for many years.

The station's western boundary is bordered by Wooleen Station.

The various stone buildings of Boolardy Station were classified by the National Trust of Western Australia on 2 September 1985.

History
Robert Austin and Kenneth Brown explored the region in 1854, noting the rich grassy plains of Boolardy and importantly, the Ngatta water hole. However, the potential of the area was not appreciated until 1873 when John Perks and Edward Wittenoom explored the area north of the water hole while searching for sheep grazing country.

Perks and Wittenoom subsequently took up the initial lease and the first cattle and sheep were taken overland to Nookawarra in 1876, but as the site lacked suitable feed for horses, they moved to the Boolardy site. The lease was later associated with various members of the pioneering Wittenoom and Lefroy families, particularly Edward and Frank Wittenoom and Langlois Lefroy.

By 1912 the station expected to shear 25,000 sheep using 16 stands in the shearing shed.

The station has consistently produced quality wool attracting high prices, at a wool sale in Perth in 1927 a small star lot of super combing sold from the station was sold for 28½d per pound, the most expensive at the sale.

When the Murchison River and Gascoyne River catchments were inundated severe floods occurred in 2010, parts of Boolardy were submerged and the State Emergency Service despatched a helicopter to check on the welfare of those stranded at the station.

Little rain fell at Boolardy over 2012 and early 2013 resulting in dust storms and little green feed being available for stock. The then owners, Mark and Carolyn Halleen, left the area between 2013 and 2015.

Murchison Radio-astronomy Observatory
Two large radio telescope projects on the Boolardy site, the Murchison Widefield Array and the Australian Square Kilometre Array Pathfinder, are precursors to the dual-sited Square Kilometre Array (SKA), with the other two sites being situated in the Karoo area of the Northern Cape Province in South Africa.

See also
List of homesteads in Western Australia
List of ranches and stations

References

State Register of Heritage Places in the Mid West (Western Australia)
Homesteads in Western Australia
Pastoral leases in Western Australia
Stations (Australian agriculture)
Square Kilometre Array
Shire of Murchison